Someshwar Fort is the highest peak in Bihar, India. It is situated in the district of West Champaran. The fort itself is a ruin.

References

Forts in Bihar
West Champaran district